The Tokayev Cabinet was the 4th government of Kazakhstan under the leadership of Kassym-Jomart Tokayev. It was formed shortly after Prime Minister Nurlan Balgimbayev resigned from his post on 1 October 1999 shortly before the legislative election to become the president of Kazakhoil. President Nursultan Nazarbayev named Kassym-Jomart Tokayev as the Acting Prime Minister, who, prior to that, served as the Deputy Prime Minister as well as the Minister of Foreign Affairs under Balgimbayev's cabinet. On 12 October, the Parliament approved Tokayev's nomination to the post of the PM.

On 20 November 2001, Tokayev threatened to resign if Nazarbayev would not dismiss several government officials who formed Democratic Choice of Kazakhstan (QDT) as he accused of them of working for the "outsiders", which sparked a political crisis. In December 2001, Nazarbayev removed several cabinet members such as Deputy Prime Minister Oraz Jandosov and Deputy Defense Minister Jannat Ertlesova. On 28 January 2002, Tokayev himself resigned stating that "it was time for new people with new ideas" without further explanations. That same day, he was appointed as the State Secretary and Foreign Affairs Minister, while his successor, Imangali Tasmagambetov, became the new PM.

Composition

References 

Cabinets of Kazakhstan
1999 in Kazakhstan
Cabinets established in 1999
1999 establishments in Kazakhstan